The 2013 SEC men's basketball tournament was the postseason men's basketball tournament for the Southeastern Conference held from March 13–17, 2013 in Nashville, Tennessee at Bridgestone Arena.  The first round and quarterfinal rounds were televised through the SEC Network and ESPNU, and the semifinals and finals were broadcast nationally on ABC.

Format
With the addition of Missouri and Texas A&M to the league, the tournament expanded to 14 teams. As in previous years, the top four teams received byes to the quarterfinals; these byes now became double-byes with the addition of a new round featuring the four lowest seeds (11 through 14; seeds 5 through 10 receive a single bye into the second round).  After these matchups on the first day, the rest of the tournament proceeds as in previous years, with the 11/14 and 12/13 winners facing, respectively, seeds 6 and 5, and seeds 7 & 10 and 8 & 9 also squaring off in the second round.  The four winners on the second day join the top four seeds in the quarterfinals.

Seeds

Schedule

Bracket

OT denotes overtime game

SEC All-tournament team

 Marshall Henderson, Ole Miss MVP
 Erik Murphy, Florida
 Kenny Boynton, Florida
 Reginald Buckner, Ole Miss
 Murphy Holloway, Ole Miss

References

2012–13 Southeastern Conference men's basketball season
SEC men's basketball tournament
Basketball competitions in Nashville, Tennessee
2013 in sports in Tennessee
College sports tournaments in Tennessee